Zebrene Parish is an administrative unit of Dobele Municipality, Latvia.

Towns, villages and settlements of Zebrene Parish 
Zebrene

References 

Dobele Municipality
Parishes of Latvia